Gail S. Haines (born 19 December 1951) is a former American politician from Michigan. Haines was a Republican member of Michigan House of Representatives.

Education
In 1973, Haines earned a Bachelor of Science degree in Education from State University of New York. Haines earned a Master of Science degree in Education from Nazareth College.

Career
Haines was a public school teacher and an educator.

On November 4, 2010, Haines won an election to the state house and became a Republican member of Michigan House of Representatives for District 43. Haines defeated Scott Hudson and Paul J. Greenawalt with 49.25% of the vote. On November 6, 2012, as an incumbent, Haines won the election and continued serving District 43. Haines defeated Neil Billington with 60.76% of the votes.

A former member of the Lake Angelus city council, Haines is a member of a number of community boards and organizations.

Personal life
Haines' husband is David. They have one child. Haines and her family live in Waterford Township, Michigan.

See also
2008 Michigan House of Representatives election
2010 Michigan House of Representatives election

References

External links
Gail Haines at ballotpedia.org

1951 births
Living people
Republican Party members of the Michigan House of Representatives
Women state legislators in Michigan
People from Waterford, Michigan
Michigan city council members
Nazareth College (New York) alumni
State University of New York alumni
Women city councillors in Michigan
21st-century American women politicians
21st-century American politicians